Eteobalea anonymella is a moth in the family Cosmopterigidae. It is found in most of Europe, except the Benelux, Great Britain, Ireland, Iceland, Norway and Denmark.

The wingspan is 9–13 mm. Adults are on wing from May to mid-August. There is probably a second generation with adults on wing from the end of August to the beginning of September.

References

Moths described in 1965
Eteobalea
Moths of Europe